Agrostis tolucensis  is a species of grass which is found in South America, the United States, and Mexico.

Description
It is also inflorescenced, linear, and spiciform as well.

It have solitary spikelets which carry one fertile floret and have a pubescent callus.

The glumes are purple in colour, oblong, membranous, have no lateral veins and have acute apexes. They also have one keel and one vein which is scabrous. The fruits are caryopses with an additional pericarp and linear hilum.

Distribution

References

tolucensis
Flora of South America